Kamar Gelap (Dark Room) is the second album by Indonesian independent music band Efek Rumah Kaca. Released on December 19, 2008, it received the 2010 ICEMA award for best album of the year.

Production
The recording of Kamar Gelap was more concentrated in studio, unlike the first album (which recorded at the band members' houses). Some musicians collaborated with Efek Rumah Kaca during recording, such as Ramondo Gascaro on "Laki-Laki Pemalu", Ade Paloh provided backing vocals and Iman Fattah played guitar on "Jangan Bakar Buku".

Track listing

Musical styles
The Smashing Pumpkins, R.E.M. and The Smiths are cited by the band as influences in the making of Kamar Gelap.
In "Lagu Kesepian", the music is progressive pop but melancholic. On "Laki-Laki Pemalu", waltz is dominating. "Tubuhmu Membiru.. Tragis" has a "catchy" melody and "Balerina" has a pop style.

Themes
The themes of the album are life style, love, phenomenon, environment and social critic. Social commentary can be found on "Mosi Tidak Percaya", with its lyrics regarding mistrust of the government  and "Jangan Bakar Buku". Environmental themes can be found on "Hujan Jangan Marah" (about flooding) and "Banyak Asap Di Sana" (about economic equality and urbanization).

Release and reception
Kamar Gelap was released on December 19, 2008, by Aksara Records. The band claimed they captured social incidents and translated it into music. To perfect it, they hired photographers to make interpretative photos of their songs. On CD version, there is a fusion of the personnel's faces.

More than 3,000 copies were sold in the first two weeks of release, and the album was selected as ICEMA's  The Best Album of 2010.

References

2008 albums
2009 albums
Indonesian-language albums
Efek Rumah Kaca albums